The EMD GT22 Series were first introduced in 1972 after the rise in popularity of six axle locomotives. The GT series now carried a turbocharger that increased the horsepower depending on customer input. The GT series also utilized six axle HTC Trucks, which allowed the locomotive to haul heavier loads at slower speeds with minimal wheelslip.

The GT22C series also gave itself various individual designations depending on customer input. Standard suffixes after the model designation were either a U or W suffix to indicate the type of traction motors. A C generally indicated six axle trucks but due to a six axle locomotive being too oversized for most second and third world countries, EMD developed the L suffix to indicate the locomotive was constructed with a Lightweight frame. EMD Dash 2 electronics also became a popular choice for the export railroads by the late 1970s.

These designations could apply to any kind of export locomotive design of EMD or another licensee of EMD as long as the electrical & mechanical gear was left unaltered.

Overview 
With the introduction of the 645 engine for export models in 1967, the model designation numbers changed by adding 10 to the designation of a similar model (For example: the G12 now became the G22). To meet customer demands of a six axle version of the popular G12, EMD created the GR12 which was slightly longer and taller to accommodate the Type-C trucks.

EMD then designed the GT22 model to accommodate the HT-C truck first found on the American EMD SD45X. Extending the carbody and increasing the fuel tank capacity, the GT22C series was introduced. Production spanned longer than the four axle G22 version, but with smaller orders.

Several models were introduced:

GT22CW
GT22CU
GT22CW-2
GT22HW-2
GT22CUM-1
GT22CUM-2
GT22LC
GT22LC-2
GT22MC

GT22CW
Another new suffix introduced to this model was the T, which indicated the use of a turbocharger.

The GT22CW found most of its popularity in Argentina, while two unusual orders went to the Saudi Railways Organization in Saudi Arabia & the Société Nationale des Transports Ferroviaires of Algeria.

Production spanned from July 1972 to February 1988

GT22CU

The EMD GT22CU was first appeared in 1972. Designed mainly for the narrow gauge market, the GT22CU now carried a CU suffix which indicated that this model had six axles (C) and traction motors that could fit from one meter to  gauge tracks (U). Another new suffix introduced to this model was the T, which indicated the use of a turbocharger.

The GT22CU was purchased by the Ferrocarriles Argentinos from June 1972 to January 1980.

GT22CW-2
The EMD GT22CW-2 was first appeared in 1988 and now carried a CW suffix which indicated that this model had six axles (C) and traction motors that could fit from Standard Gauge rails to  gauge tracks (W). Another new suffix introduced to this model was the T, which indicated the use of a turbocharger. Finally, this model now carried the popular EMD Dash 2 electronics which improved its reliability.

The GT22CW-2 found most of its popularity in Argentina and even after the breakup of Ferrocarriles Argentinos, did the successors of that company continued to purchase more GT22CW-2s.

Production spanned from March 1988 to December 1997.

GT22HW-2

The GT22HW-2 was a departure from the standard production of the GT22 Series as it was a custom model designed to meet the conditions of Yugoslavia. This multipurpose locomotive was introduced with a turbocharger (T), Head End Power (H) for passenger use and EMD Dash 2 Electronics (-2), with an A1A-A1A axle arrangement. Thirty four of these locomotives were manufactured by Đuro Đaković between February 1981 and August 1984. Since Yugoslavia had various languages arising from the ethnicities in the country, the locomotives were given four different lettering variations:

GT22CUM

First introduced in January 1982, the GT22CUM series were locomotives were a powerful single-engined locomotive with light weight per-axle. Designed exclusively for the RFFSA by Equipmentos Villares S.A., the GT22CUM now carried a CU suffix which indicated that this model had six axles (C) and traction motors that could fit from one meter to  gauge tracks (U). Two custom designations were introduced for this locomotive: M for meter gauge and  -1/-2 to indicate a Type 1 or Type 2 model.

The Type 1 Model is distinguished by not including an air reservoir on both sides of the carbody.
The Type 2 Model is distinguished by an extended nose and an air reservoir on both sides of the carbody.

Production spanned from January 1982 to May 1986.

All subsidiaries of the RFFSA were consolidated in 1983 with the introduction of the SIGO System by the federal government.

GT22LC
When most second and third world railroads couldn't operate standard EMD GT22s due to their weight, EMD introduced the GT22LC; which is the same as a GT22C, but now incorporated with a much lighter (L) frame to handle harsher conditions than normal while still equipped with a turbocharger. Due to the lightweight frame, the U or W suffixes no longer applied as the locomotive was designed to handle any rail gauge the locomotive is applied to.

Production spanned from February 1985 to August 1986.

GT22LC-2
Basically the same as the GT22LC, the GT22LC-2 now added EMD Dash 2 Electronics while still retaining a turbocharger. Due to the Lightweight frame, the U or W suffixes no longer applied.

Production spanned from November 1981 to November 1996.

See also 
List of GM-EMD locomotives
List of GMD Locomotives

Sources 
Electro-Motive Division Export GM Models
Astilleros Argentinos Rio de la Plata S.A. GM Export Models
Henschel und Sohn GmbH GM Export Models
Đuro Đaković GM Export Models
Equipamentos Villares S.A. GM Export Models
General Motors Diesel Division Export Models
GM GT22CU/GT22CW Data Sheet
:pt:EMD G22CU EMD G22CU Article in Portuguese.

C-C locomotives
Co-Co locomotives
Export locomotives
Diesel-electric locomotives of Algeria
Diesel-electric locomotives of Argentina
Diesel-electric locomotives of Brazil
Diesel-electric locomotives of Botswana
Diesel-electric locomotives of the Democratic Republic of the Congo
Diesel-electric locomotives of Mali
Diesel-electric locomotives of Mozambique
Diesel-electric locomotives of Saudi Arabia
Diesel-electric locomotives of Senegal
Diesel-electric locomotives of Yugoslavia
Diesel-electric locomotives of Zimbabwe
Railway locomotives introduced in 1972
G22TC
Diesel-electric locomotives of Ivory Coast
3 ft 6 in gauge locomotives
Standard gauge railway locomotives
5 ft 6 in gauge locomotives